Gustavo Javier Del Prete (born 12 June 1996) is an Argentine professional footballer who plays as a forward for Liga MX club UNAM.

Career
A youth academy product of Cipolletti, Del Prete made his senior debut for club on 2 March 2014 in a 0–0 draw against Racing de Olavarría.

Uruguayan Segunda División side Montevideo City Torque signed Del Prete in January 2019. He was top scorer of Torque in 2019 season, as club became Segunda División champions and earned the promotion to 2020 Uruguayan Primera División season. He scored his first top division goal on 26 February 2020 in a 3–1 win against Fénix.

On 3 July 2021, Argentine club Estudiantes announced the signing of Del Prete on a contract until December 2024. In June 2022, he joined Mexican club UNAM on a contract until June 2025.

Honours
Montevideo City Torque
Uruguayan Segunda División: 2019

References

External links
 

1996 births
Living people
Argentine people of Italian descent
Association football forwards
Argentine footballers
Torneo Federal A players
Uruguayan Segunda División players
Uruguayan Primera División players
Club Cipolletti footballers
Montevideo City Torque players
Argentine expatriate footballers
Expatriate footballers in Uruguay
Argentine expatriate sportspeople in Uruguay
People from Cipolletti